Main is an impact crater on Mars, located in the Mare Australe quadrangle at 76.6°S latitude and 310.9°W longitude. It measures 109.0 kilometers in diameter and was named after Rev. Robert Main. The name was approved in 1973, by the International Astronomical Union (IAU) Working Group for Planetary System Nomenclature (WGPSN).  The floor of Main shows dark portions which are caused by pressurized carbon dioxide blowing dust in the atmosphere in the spring when the temperature goes up.  Some of the dust is shaped into streaks if there is a wind.

Many ideas have been advanced to explain these features.  These features can be seen in some of the pictures below.

Close up views of these features often reveal fuzzy features that have been named "spiders."

See also

 Climate of Mars
 Geology of Mars
 Geyser (Mars)
 Impact crater
 Impact event
 List of craters on Mars
 Ore resources on Mars
 Planetary nomenclature
 Water on Mars

References 

Mare Australe quadrangle
Impact craters on Mars